The Mystery of Edwin Drood is a 1993 film, the fourth film adaptation of the Charles Dickens unfinished 1870 novel of the same name. This was the last film of Barry Evans.

Cast
 Robert Powell as John Jasper
 Jonathan Phillips as Edwin Drood
 Peter Pacey as Septimus Crisparkle
 Nanette Newman as Mrs. Crisparkle
 Freddie Jones as Sapsea
 Gemma Craven as Miss Twinkleton
 Marc Sinden as Mr Honeythunder
 Rosemary Leach as Mrs. Tope
 Glyn Houston as Grewgious
 Andrew Sachs as Durdles
 Barry Evans as Bazzard
 Ronald Fraser as Dean
 Finty Williams as Rosa

Locations
Many scenes were filmed in Rochester, including Minor Canon Row and Rochester Cathedral which doubled as Cloisterham Cathedral.

References

External links
 
 

1993 films
British drama films
British historical films
British mystery films
1993 drama films
1990s historical films
Films based on works by Charles Dickens
The Mystery of Edwin Drood
1990s English-language films
1990s British films